Alan Bean is a white former minister working to uncover injustice and organize black opposition, in the racial controversies surrounding the Tulia 46 drug sting
 in Tulia, Texas and the Jena Six controversy in Jena, Louisiana.
In 1999, Dr. Alan Bean founded the organization, Friends of Justice, an alliance of community members to advocate for criminal justice reform.

References

External links
 Friends of Justice official website

Living people
Year of birth missing (living people)
American activists
People from Tulia, Texas